Sir John Wittewronge, 3rd Baronet (1673 – 1722), of Stantonbury, Buckinghamshire, was a British Army officer and  Whig politician who sat in the English and British House of Commons between 1705 and 1722.

Family
Wittewrong was baptized on 11 July 1673, the third, but eldest surviving, son of Sir John Wittewronge, 2nd Baronet. His mother was Wittewronge's second wife, Martha Seabrook of Mark Lane, London.  Wittewronge married Mary née White daughter of Samuel White, London merchant.

Career
In 1709 Wittewronge was given the colonelcy of a new regiment raised in Ireland but put on half-pay in 1712 when it was disbanded.

Wittewronge  was returned as  Member of Parliament  for Aylesbury at the 1705 English general election. He was returned again at the 1708 British general election. At the 1713 British general election he was returned as MP for Chipping Wycombe.
 
On his death on 26 January 1722, he left 3 sons and 4 daughters. He was succeeded as baronet by his eldest son John, who was later killed in a brawl in the Fleet Prison. He left Stantonbury in trust to provide for all his children plus his mistress and a further two illegitimate sons by her. It was eventually sold in 1727 to the Duchess of Marlborough.

References

 
 

1673 births
1722 deaths
People from Buckinghamshire
Members of the Parliament of Great Britain for English constituencies
Baronets in the Baronetage of England
English MPs 1705–1707
British MPs 1707–1708
British MPs 1708–1710
British MPs 1713–1715
British MPs 1715–1722